Max Trewin (2 January 1927 – 19 April 2005) was an  Australian rules footballer who played with Geelong in the Victorian Football League (VFL).

Notes

External links 

1927 births
2005 deaths
Australian rules footballers from Victoria (Australia)
Geelong Football Club players
Place of birth missing